Auchagallon Stone Circle or Auchengallon cairn is the remains of a Neolithic or Bronze Age burial cairn, surrounded by a circle of fifteen stones. It is located near Machrie on the Isle of Arran in Scotland.

Description
The cairn and stone circle is situated on a slight ledge of a west-facing slope, overlooking Machrie Bay. The circle comprises fifteen blocks varying in height from 0.5 metres to 2.3 metres. The stones are of red sandstone, except two which are a pale grey granite. The circle has a maximum diameter of 14.5 metres.

In the centre is a large stone cairn. Antiquarians digging here in the 19th century found a burial cist in the centre, although there are no records of any other remains. Although the monument is now called a stone circle, it was probably built as a kerbed cairn.

References

External links

Historic Environment Scotland: Visitor guide

Isle of Arran
Archaeological sites in North Ayrshire
Stone circles in North Ayrshire
Historic Scotland properties in North Ayrshire
Scheduled Ancient Monuments in North Ayrshire